Magnesium fluoride is an inorganic compound with the formula . The compound is a white crystalline salt and is transparent over a wide range of wavelengths, with commercial uses in optics that are also used in space telescopes. It occurs naturally as the rare mineral sellaite.

Production
Magnesium fluoride is prepared from magnesium oxide with sources of hydrogen fluoride such as ammonium bifluoride:

Related metathesis reactions are also feasible.

Structure
The compound crystallizes as tetragonal birefringent crystals. The structure of the magnesium fluoride is similar to that of rutile, featuring octahedral  cations and 3-coordinate  anions.

In the gas phase, monomeric  molecules adopt a linear molecular geometry.

Uses

Optics
Magnesium fluoride is transparent over an extremely wide range of wavelengths. Windows, lenses, and prisms made of this material can be used over the entire range of wavelengths from 0.120 μm (vacuum ultraviolet) to 8.0 μm (infrared). High-quality, synthetic magnesium fluoride is one of two materials (the other being lithium fluoride) that will transmit in the vacuum ultraviolet range at 121 nm (Lyman alpha). Lower-grade magnesium fluoride is inferior to calcium fluoride in the infrared range.

Magnesium fluoride is tough and polishes well but is slightly birefringent and should therefore be cut with the optic axis perpendicular to the plane of the window or lens. Due to its suitable refractive index of 1.37, magnesium fluoride is commonly applied in thin layers to the surfaces of optical elements as an inexpensive anti-reflective coating. Its Verdet constant is 0.00810arcmin⋅G–1⋅cm–1 at 632.8 nm.

Safety 
Chronic exposure to magnesium fluoride may affect the skeleton, kidneys, central nervous system, respiratory system, eyes and skin, and may cause or aggravate attacks of asthma.

References

External links
A java applet showing the effect of MgF2 on a lens
Infrared windows at Lawrence Berkeley National Laboratory
National Pollutant Inventory - Fluoride and compounds fact sheet
Crystran Data Crystran MSDS

Fluorides
Magnesium compounds
Alkaline earth metal halides
Optical materials